General of the Army (Spanish: General de Ejército), also called Army General, is a four-star general officer and the second highest possible rank in the Spanish Army. A General of the Army ranks immediately above a Lieutenant general and is equivalent to an Admiral General and a General of the Air. There is no equivalent in the Civil Guard or in the Spanish Navy Marines; in both cases the top rank is Lieutenant General.

The rank was created in 1999 to adapt the Spanish military ranks to the ranks of NATO This is the highest rank that a military officer can reach, because the next higher is Captain General and that rank is only reserved to the King or Queen as commander-in-chief of the Armed Forces (even that sometimes has been given as an honorary rank to some generals).

The General of the Army insignia consist of a baton crossed over a sabre under a Royal Crown and a star in every angle that form the crossed baton and the sabre. Being under a Crown means that the rank is part of the generalship (the group of generals of the Armed Forces), the baton and the sabre means command and the four stars means the rank of General. This insignia was used before to 1999 by the Head of State as Captain General.

Promotion
The promotion to General of the Army is reserved to two positions. These are, the Chief of the Defence Staff and the Chief of Staff of the Army.

Both positions are appointed by the Government, the first is directly nominated by the Prime Minister and the second is nominated by the Minister of Defence. Being appointed Chief of the Defence Staff means the automatically promotion to the rank of General of the Army. The same happens with the Chief of Staff of the Army with the exception if the official appointed has the rank of Divisional general, in that case, the official needs to be promoted first to Lieutenant general.

Living Generals of the Army
As of September 2018, there are 9 Generals of the Army alive, these are:

The most recent Army General to die was Ramón Porgueres Hernández on 18 December 2018, who served as Chief of Staff of the Army from 1990 to 1994. Under his command, the Armed Forces were deployed abroad for the first time since the restoration of democracy.

References

Lists of Spanish military personnel
Spanish generals
Four-star officers